Greentech College of Engineering for Women is an engineering college in Attur, Tamil Nadu, southern India. It is affiliated to Anna University and approved by the All India Council for Technical Education (AICTE), government of India. It was established in 2008.

Courses
 B.E/B.TECH (four years)
 Computer Science Engineering
 Information Technology
 Electronics & Communication Engineering
 Electrical & Electronics Engineering

Co-curricular activities

NSS is the school's National Service Scheme. It develops the ability to meet emergencies and natural disasters and  practice national integration and social harmony.
YRC (the Youth Red Cross) encourages the public to donate blood. The Blood Donors' Club takes care of blood grouping, conducting blood donation camps, etc.
RRC creates awareness about HIV and AIDS among students. Tamil Nadu State AIDS Control Society has come out with a statewide action programme.
Maths club organizes aptitude tests and puzzle training to enrich the analytical skills of the students.
  English club: The "GREENWEB" is a forum to enhance the oral and aural skills of the technical students. Budding engineers participate in elocution, paper presentation, group discussion, caption writing, spellout, master mind, debate, news reading, poem composition, news reporting etc.
 Cyber club: The Science Club of the college provides students with a glimpse of the frontiers of science not covered in the syllabus. The club invites scientists to share their experience with the students.

See also
Education in India
Literacy in India
List of educational institutions in Salem, India
List of institutions of higher education in Tamil Nadu

References

External links 
 https://web.archive.org/web/20110415090418/http://greentech.ac.in/

Women's engineering colleges in India
Engineering colleges in Tamil Nadu
Women's universities and colleges in Tamil Nadu
Colleges affiliated to Anna University
Education in Salem district
Educational institutions established in 2008
2008 establishments in Tamil Nadu